Pęzinka is a river of Poland, a tributary of the Krępiel in Pęzino.

Rivers of Poland
Rivers of West Pomeranian Voivodeship